Georgian Technical University (GTU, formerly V.I. Lenin Georgian Polytechnical Institute) is the main and largest technical university of Georgia. It is located in the capital city of Tbilisi.

History 
Georgian Technical University was founded in 1922 as a polytechnic faculty of the Tbilisi State University. The first lecture  was read by Georgian mathematician Professor Andrea Razmadze.

Transformed in 1928 into an independent "Georgian Politechnical Institute" it achieved University status by 1990.

Faculties and departments  
All faculty deans and heads of departments are full professors.
 Faculty of Civil Engineering (Acting Dean: Zurab Gvishiani)

 Department of Mechanical Engineering 
 Department of Civil and Industrial Engineering 
 Department of Hydro-Engineering 

 Faculty of Power Engineering and Telecommunications (Acting Dean: Elene Shatakishvili)

 Department of Telecommunication 
 Department of Thermal and Hydro-Power Engineering 
 Department of Electric Power Engineering, Electrics and Electromechanics 

 Faculty of Mining and Geology (Dean: Anzor Abshilava)

 Department of Geodesy Engineering 
 Department of Mining Technology 
 Department of Geology 
 Department of Oil and Gas Technology

 Faculty of Chemical Technology and Metallurgy (Dean: Nugzar Tsereteli)

 Department of Chemical Technology and Biotechnology 
 Department of Metallurgy, Metals Science and Metal 

 Faculty of Architecture, Urban Planning and Design (Dean: Nino Imnadze)

 Department of Architecture and Urbanistics 
 Department of Theory and Basics of Architecture

 Faculty of Informatics and Control Systems (Dean: Zurab Tsveraidze)

 Department of Artificial Intelligence 
 Department of Computer Engineering 
 Department of Cybernetics Engineering and Instrument-Making 
 Department of Organizational Control 
 Department of Physics
 Department of Mathematics 

 Faculty of Transportation and Machine-Building (Dean: Otar Gelashvili)

 Department of Machine-Building
 Department of Transportation 
 Department of Roads 
 Department of Graphics Engineering and Technical Mechanics 

  Faculty of Business Technologies  (Dean: Rusudan Kutateladze)
 Faculty of Engineering Economics, Media-Technology and Social Sciences (Dean Ivane Jagodnishvili)
 Faculty of Law and International Relations (Dean Irakli Gabisonia)
 International Design School (Dean Nikoloz Shavishvili)
 Faculty of Agricultural Sciences and Bio-systems Engineering (Dean Giga Qvartskhava)

Structure 
 Rector of the Technical University of Georgia — David Gurgenidze (Doctor of Technical Sciences, Professor )
 Vice-Rector  — Levan Klimiashvili (Doctor of Technical Sciences,  Professor  )
 Deputy Rector for Research — Zurab Gasitashvili (Doctor of Technical Sciences,  Professor  )
 Head of the Administration (Chancellor) — Karlo Kopaliani (Doctor of Social Sciences)
 Head of the Quality Assurance Service — Irma Inashvili 
 Perspective Development Office — Tamaz Batsikadze (Doctor of Technical Sciences, Full Professor )
 International Relations and Standards Office   — Otar Zumburidze  (Doctor of Technical Sciences, Professor )
 Academic Council  — David Gurgenidze, Rector of the Technical University of Georgia
 Council of Representatives (Senate) — Jemal Gakhokhidze (Doctor of Political Science)

Structural Units 
 Department of Education | Head of the Department - Tamar Tsereteli
 Department of Sciences | Head of the Department – David Tavkhelidze
 Department of Commercialization | Head of the Department – Mamuka Matsaberidze
 University Library  | Director - Vazha Papaskiri
 Logistic Department | Head of the Department - Nikoloz Nebieridze
 Human Resource Management | Head of the Section - Khatuna Chkhikvishvili
 Chancellery | Head of the Chancellery - Eliko Okhanashvili
 Section of Law | Head of the Section- Beka Maisuradze
 Planning-Finance Section | Head of the Section – 
 Accounting Section | Head of the Section - Tamaz Urtmelidze
 Life-Long Learning and Correspondence Education | Head of the Section – Lali Gogeliani
 Publishing House "Technical University" | Chairman of the Guardian Council – Marina Medzmariashvili
 Students and Alumni Relations, Sport and Culture Section | Head of the Section - Revaz Gurgenidze
 Information Technologies Section  | Head of the Section - David Chikovani
 Geoecology Monitoring Section  | Head of the Section – Dimitri Abzianidze
 Diplomas Sector | Head of the Sector - Roseta Mgaloblishvili
 Archive  | Head of the Archive - Rusudan Tatarashvili
 Military Mobilization Sector | Head of the Sector - Nino Chubinidze
 Monitoring Group | Head of the Group – David Gorgidze
 Purchasing Group | Head of theGroup – Eka Ivanishvili
 Scientific-Technological Centre for Sensory Electronics and Materials Sciences | Head of theCentre – Merab Tabutsadze
 Polytechnic Museum | Director – Manana Tevzadze

Organization 
Georgian Technical University has more than 22 000 students and around 2 500 faculty and staff members. Major faculties of the university are as follows:
Civil Engineering
Power Engineering and Telecommunication
Mining and Geology
Chemical Technology and Metallurgy
Architecture, Urban planning and Design
Informatics and Control Systems;
Transportation and Machine-Building
Humanities and Social

Georgian Technical University has provided over 60% of Georgia's engineering, chemistry and scientific industry specialists for the last eighty years. While its major counterpart Tbilisi State University focuses on popular specialties like Civil Law or Economics, GTU continues its fine tradition of providing technical specialists to the industry and exact sciences. Additionally, over the recent years GTU added more establishments, "Caucasus Business School" — A joint project of GTU, Tbilisi State University and Georgia State University (Atlanta, Georgia, USA), German Studies faculty, a Franco-Georgian Studies Faculty and a "Cisco Networking Academy". GTU also has thirteen offspring institutes all over the country.

GTU uses the ECTS grading scale and awards degrees and diplomas in Diploma of Specialist, Bachelor of Science, Bachelor of Arts, and Master of Science. 
The first three degrees require four to four-and-one-half years of full-time studies; the Master of Sciences degree requires a year-and-one-half to two years of full-time studies. Most students (apart from those in humanities or arts specialties) undergo rigorous training in mathematics and fundamental sciences while studying at the GTU. GTU is known for its strong ties with "Andrea Razmadze Institute of Mathematics of Georgia", the leading mathematical research institute in Transcaucasia.

GTU also awards scientific Ph.D.s that require three or more years of advanced studies depending on specialty.

All degrees are also provided as part-time and distance studies; these may take much longer to complete.

GTU's scientific library is one of the largest libraries in Georgia, comprising 1,254,000 books of which many are unique and rare finds, and 500,000 periodic materials. Plans are underway for digitizing this large collection of knowledge.

Notable alumni 

 Irakli Khakhubia Georgian politician

Footnotes

External links 

Official web site

Georgian Technical University
Universities and institutes established in the Soviet Union
Educational institutions established in 1922
1922 establishments in Georgia (country)
Buildings and structures in Tbilisi